The 2018–19 Drake Bulldogs women's basketball team represents Drake University during the 2018–19 NCAA Division I women's basketball season. The Bulldogs, led by seventh-year head coach Jennie Baranczyk, play their home games at Knapp Center and are members of the Missouri Valley Conference.

Previous season
The Bulldogs finished the 2017–18 season 26–8, 18–0 in MVC play to win the MVC regular season championship. They defeated Valparaiso, Southern Illinois and Northern Iowa to become champions of the Missouri Valley women's tournament. They earned an automatic trip to the NCAA women's tournament where they lost to Texas A&M in the first round.

Roster

Rankings

^ No Week 2 poll released.

Schedule

|-
!colspan=6 style=| Exhibition

|-
!colspan=6 style=| Non-conference regular season

|-
!colspan=6 style=| Missouri Valley Conference regular season

|-
!colspan=6 style=| Missouri Valley Women's Tournament

|-
!colspan=9 style="background:#004477; color:#FFFFFF;"| NCAA Women's Tournament

References

Drake Bulldogs women's basketball seasons
Drake
Drake
Drake
Drake